Luzius Raschein (25 January 1831 – 9 November 1899) was a Swiss politician and President of the Swiss Council of States (1897/1898).

External links 
 
 

1831 births
1899 deaths
Members of the Council of States (Switzerland)
Presidents of the Council of States (Switzerland)